Moorpark Unified School District is a public school district based in Ventura County, California, United States. As of 2022, the district's superintendent is Dr. Kelli Hays.

Schools
There are 10 schools in the district.

 Arroyo West Active Learning Academy
 Flory Academy of Sciences & Technology
 Mountain Meadows 21st Century Learning Academy
 Peach Hill Academy
 Walnut Canyon School
 Campus Canyon College Preparatory Academy
 Chaparral Middle School
 Mesa Verde Middle School
 Moorpark High School
 High School at Moorpark College

References

External links
 

Moorpark, California
School districts in Ventura County, California